The 1979–80 Challenge Cup, for sponsorship reasons known as the 1979–80 State Express Challenge Cup was the 79th staging of rugby league's oldest knockout competition, the Challenge Cup.

The final was the first Hull Cup final derby, with a heavy entourage of supporters from the East and West of the city making the trip to London. Hull Kingston Rovers defeated Hull 10-5 at Wembley before a crowd of 95,000.

The winner of the Lance Todd Trophy was Rovers' prop, Brian Lockwood, despite Rovers' Steve Hubbard's scoring 9 out  of his side's 10 points.

This was Hull Kingston Rovers’ first, and to date, only Cup final Win in six Final appearances.

First round

Second round

Quarter-finals

Semi-finals

Final

References

External links
Challenge Cup official website 
Challenge Cup 1979/80 results at Rugby League Project

Challenge Cup
Challenge Cup